The Graphic Arts International Union (GAIU) was a labor union representing printing workers in the United States and Canada.

The union was founded on September 4, 1972, when the International Brotherhood of Bookbinders merged with the Lithographers' and Photoengravers' International Union. Like both its predecessors, it affiliated to the AFL–CIO.

By 1981, the union had 115,000 members. On May 25, 1983, it merged with the International Printing and Graphic Communications Union, to form the Graphic Communications International Union.

Throughout its existence, the union was led by president Kenneth J. Brown.

References

Trade unions established in 1972
Trade unions disestablished in 1983
Printing trade unions